The 1996 Oceania Handball Nations Cup was the second edition of the Oceania Handball Nations Cup, held from 8 to 9 December 1996 in Porirua, New Zealand. The winner would play Lithuania in the qualifying competition for the 1997 World Men's Handball Championship.

Australia and New Zealand played a two-game series to determine the winner.

Overview

Game 1

Game 2

References

External links
Results at todor66.com

Oceania Handball Nations Cup
Oceania Handball Championship
International handball competitions hosted by New Zealand
1996 in New Zealand sport
December 1996 sports events in New Zealand